Ponte do Rio Vade is a bridge in Portugal. It is located in Viana do Castelo District.

It's classified as Properties of Public Interest in Portugal

See also
List of bridges in Portugal

Bridges in Viana do Castelo District
Ponte da Barca
Properties of Public Interest in Portugal